The 1932 United States Senate election in North Dakota took place on November 8, 1932. Incumbent Republican Senator Gerald Nye ran for re-election to his second term. He was challenged in the Republican primary by Governor George F. Shafer, but easily won renomination. In the general election, he faced P. W. Lanier, a 1930 Democratic congressional candidate. Even as Democrats were performing well nationwide, Nye had little difficulty winning re-election in a landslide.

Democratic Primary

Candidates
 P. W. Lanier, 1930 Democratic congressional candidate
 Halvor L. Halvorson

Results

Republican Primary

Candidates
 Gerald Nye, incumbent U.S. Senator
 George F. Shafer, Governor of North Dakota

Results

General election

Results

References

1932
North Dakota
United States Senate